Borghetti or Borgetti is an Italian surname that may refer to the following people:

Cida Borghetti (born 1965), Brazilian politician
Gian Paolo Borghetti (1816–1897), a Corsican writer, poet and politician
Luigi Borghetti (born 1943), Italian Olympic cyclist
Renato Borghetti (born 1963), Brazilian folk musician and composer
Carla Borghetti (born 1971), Argentinian singer
Patricio Borghetti (born 1973), Argentinian actor and singer
Michele Borghetti (born 1973), Italian draughts player
Jared Borgetti (born 1973), Mexican footballer
Pierluigi Borghetti (born 1984), Italian footballer
Guglielmo Borghetti (born 1954), Italian Catholic bishop

Italian-language surnames